Donald A. Losby, Jr (born May 26, 1951 in San Francisco, California) is an American actor, known primarily for his many character roles in popular television during the 1950s and 1960s in programs such as The Adventures of Ozzie and Harriet, The Andy Griffith Show, The Twilight Zone, Wagon Train, Bonanza, Rawhide, Route 66, The Fugitive, Ben Casey, Lassie, My Three Sons, Gunsmoke (1966 “The Whispering Tree), Daniel Boone, Blue Light, Lost in Space ("Return from Outer Space"), and The Young Rebels, as well as a small number of movies, typically playing the role of someone's son.

Filmography

Trivia
 In 1963, he co-starred in an unsold pilot for a proposed comedy series called Grand Slam, about a sports columnist (played by Murray Hamilton) who can't help getting involved with other people's problems.
 His last acting role was in support of the short-lived 1970 television show The Headmaster, a vehicle for Andy Griffith that also co-starred Jerry Van Dyke.

References
Fandango Movies and Actor Bio's

1951 births
Living people
American male child actors
American male film actors
American male television actors
Male actors from California